Amerila vidua is a moth of the subfamily Arctiinae. It was described by Pieter Cramer in 1780. It is found in Cameroon, Democratic Republic of the Congo, Equatorial Guinea, Ethiopia, Ghana, Guinea, Ivory Coast, Kenya, Mauritius, Nigeria, Sierra Leone and Tanzania.

Subspecies
Amerila vidua vidua
Amerila vidua mauritia (Stoll, [1781]) (Mauritius)

References

 , 1780: De Uitlandsche Kapellen voorkomende in de drie Waereld-Deelen Asia, Africa en America [Papillons Exotiques des trois parties du monde l'Asie, l'Afrique & l'Amerique] 3: 1-176, t. CXCII-CCLXXXVII, Amsterdam, Utrecht.
 , 1997: A revision of the Afrotropical taxa of the genus Amerila Walker (Lepidoptera, Arctiidae). Systematic Entomology 22 (1): 1-44.

Moths described in 1780
Amerilini
Moths of Sub-Saharan Africa
Lepidoptera of West Africa
Moths of Mauritius
Insects of Equatorial Guinea
Lepidoptera of Ethiopia
Lepidoptera of Tanzania